Henry Lamb Kennedy (died 25 January 1933) was a Fijian politician who served for two terms in the Legislative Council.

Biography
Kennedy was born in New Zealand and attended King's School in Auckland. His family moved to Fiji in 1875, with his father becoming a planter. Kennedy was involved in cattle farming and keeping horses, and was a skilled amateur jockey.

Kennedy was elected to the Legislative Council in the Northern constituency in the 1914 elections. In the 1926 elections he was defeated by Hugh Ragg.

Kennedy died in Ba Cottage Hospital on 25 January 1933 at the age of 74.

References

New Zealand emigrants to Fiji
Fijian farmers
Members of the Legislative Council of Fiji
1933 deaths
1850s births